The Opposite Direction (Arabic: الاتجاه المعاكس , Al-Etjah Al-mo'akis) is a political debate TV show that streaming weekly, handling current events in the Middle East, and the Arab world. First episode released in 1996, until today the show still active. The topics handled are mostly influenced by political, economical or social topics, But there have been occasions where the discussion visited sensitive religious topics related to the Middle East. The TV show is hosted by Al Jazeera's TV presenter Faisal al-Qassem, while two guests representing opinions of each side of the case being debated are invited to participate in the show.

List of episodes

1996 
 The 17th Summit of the Gulf Cooperation Council (Arabic: القمة السابعة عشر لمجلس التعاون الخليجي).

1997

1998

1999 
 09/11/1999 - The secret relationship between Mauritania and Israel (Arabic: العلاقة السرية بين موريتانيا وإسرائيل).

2000

2022
 2022/1/18 - Arab regimes and people's revolutions.. who won? (Arabic: الأنظمة العربية وثورات الشعوب.. من انتصر؟)

See also
 Bela Hodod
 This is Only the Tip of the Iceberg

References 
 ×Official Website (ar)

Al Jazeera
Debate television series
Al Jazeera shows
Political debates
Arabic-language television shows
Live television shows
1990s in Qatari television
1996 in Qatari television